Beaverville (formerly St. Marie) is a village in Beaverville Township, Iroquois County, Illinois, United States. The population was 362 at the 2010 census.

History

In 1851, 32 families from the area of Montreal, Canada, mostly newlywed or single, came up the St. Lawrence River in search of farmland on the prairie. They traveled across the Great Lakes and stopped at Fort Dearborn (Chicago). Then they pushed south through the swamps and frontier until they reached the area that is now Beaverville. The settlement, named "St. Marie," was led by Francis Besse, who became a general merchant. The group consisted of families with names such as Fortin, Dionne, Boudreau, Benoit, Nourie, Lafond, Lemna, and at least six Arseneau families. They settled here because of the good land and the many creeks.

In 1905, the village name was changed to "Beaverville", when the village founders realized that there was another town in Illinois named St. Mary. The new name was inspired by the profusion of beavers in the area in the early 19th century, when Beaver Lake right across the border in Indiana still existed.

The Cathedral of the Cornfields

Beaverville is home to St. Mary's Catholic Church, known as the "Prairie Cathedral" or the "Cathedral of the Cornfields". Built in 1909, the structure is recorded in the National Register of Historic Places and is large enough that its red, clay-tile roof can be seen from several miles away.

Geography
Beaverville is located in northeastern Iroquois County at  (40.954567, -87.654016). Under Quick Facts, above, in the map of Iroquois County, Beaverville is the northeastern-most town that is colored red, not the northwestern town that (for some reason) is encircled in red.

Demographics

As of the census of 2000, there were 391 people, 151 households, and 104 families residing in the village. The racial makeup of the village was 99.23% White, 0.26% Asian, 0.26% from other races, and 0.26% from two or more races. Hispanic or Latino of any race were 0.51% of the population.

There were 151 households, out of which 29.8% had children under the age of 18 living with them, 51.7% were married couples living together, 10.6% had a female householder with no husband present, and 31.1% were non-families. 25.2% of all households were made up of individuals, and 17.9% had someone living alone who was 65 years of age or older.  The average household size was 2.59 and the average family size was 3.05.

In the village, the population was spread out, with 27.6% under the age of 18, 8.2% from 18 to 24, 23.5% from 25 to 44, 21.5% from 45 to 64, and 19.2% who were 65 years of age or older.  The median age was 38 years. For every 100 females, there were 96.5 males.  For every 100 females age 18 and over, there were 87.4 males.

The median income for a household in the village was $30,833, and the median income for a family was $34,821. Males had a median income of $31,667 versus $19,792 for females. The per capita income for the village was $13,707.  About 6.3% of families and 9.7% of the population were below the poverty line, including 7.8% of those under age 18 and 14.5% of those age 65 or over.

References

Villages in Iroquois County, Illinois
Villages in Illinois
Populated places established in 1851
French-Canadian American history
1851 establishments in Illinois